Ahmed Akram Mahmoud (born 20 October 1996) is an Egyptian competitive swimmer who is an African and youth olympic champion as well as the Egyptian record holder in the 800 and 1500-metre freestyle and 200m butterfly. He finished fourth in the 1500-metre freestyle at the 2015 World Aquatics Championships. Ahmed placed 11th at the Rio Olympics in 2016 in the 1500-metre freestyle. He currently swims with club coach Matt Magee at ONEflow Aquatics in Neckarsulm, Germany.

References

External links
 
 

Egyptian male freestyle swimmers
Living people
1996 births
Sportspeople from Cairo
Swimmers at the 2014 Summer Youth Olympics
Swimmers at the 2016 Summer Olympics
Olympic swimmers of Egypt
African Games gold medalists for Egypt
African Games medalists in swimming
African Games silver medalists for Egypt
Youth Olympic gold medalists for Egypt
Swimmers at the 2015 African Games
Swimmers at the 2019 African Games
21st-century Egyptian people